Pottinger Point is a low-lying, ice-free promontory  east of Round Point, about 500 m long, on the north coast of King George Island in the South Shetland Islands of Antarctica. It was named by the United Kingdom Antarctic Place-Names Committee (UK-APC) in 1960 for Captain Pottinger, Master of the Tartar from London, who visited the South Shetland Islands in 1821–22.

Important Bird Area
The point has been identified as an Important Bird Area (IBA) by BirdLife International because it supports a breeding colony of over 55,000 pairs of chinstrap penguins, one of the largest in the South Shetlands.

References

Headlands of King George Island (South Shetland Islands)
Important Bird Areas of Antarctica
Penguin colonies